Route 30 is a Connecticut state highway running from South Windsor to Stafford.  Although officially designated north–south, the section from South Windsor to Vernon is a major east–west arterial road.

Route description 

Route 30 begins at the junctions of US 5 and I-291 in South Windsor.  As a primary arterial road, it proceeds northeastward to the town center, where it meets Route 194, which also provides access to Route 74.  Route 30 then turns southeastward, crossing into Manchester. It then meets I-84 at Exit 63 before beginning a 1.5 mile concurrency with Route 83 as it curves northeastward.  The concurrency ends at I-84 Exit 64, where Route 30 turns east to parallel I-84 to Exit 65. After turning northeastward and intersecting Route 31, it enters Tolland, where it briefly overlaps with Route 74.   From here to its northern end, Route 30 is a minor semi-rural road as it passes through Ellington (where it intersects with Route 140), and Stafford, where it ends at Route 190.

History 

The northern part of Route 30 was commissioned as several smaller routes in the 1920s.  In 1932, these routes were combined as part of Route 15.  When Route 15 was realigned over the Wilbur Cross Highway in 1943, the old route was commissioned as Route 30.  

In 1951, Route 30 was extended at its south end from Route 74 to US 5.  In 2003, the south end was moved to the intersection of US 5 and I-291.

Junction list

References

External links

030
Transportation in Hartford County, Connecticut
Transportation in Tolland County, Connecticut